The Yide Mansion is a former residence in Beitun District, Taichung, Taiwan.

History
In 1925, Lin Mao-yang moved to the current plot of land in which the mansion stands. In 1930, he constructed the mansion during his career peak. In 1950, the mansion was sold to the Joint Logistics Headquarters. The company then used the mansion as the residence for high rank officers in 1954. In 2007, the mansion was declared historical building by Taichung City Government. Since then, the mansion underwent renovation work with a cost of NT$45 million. Green landscaping works were done since 2 October 2013 until 28 January 2014. The renovation work was completed in April 2015.

Architecture
The green landscaping area of the mansion is divided into five areas, which are Tree-Lined Resting Zone, Lawn Activity Zone, Children's Playground Zone, Recreation Zone with Texture of Military Dependents' Village and Eco-Forest Zone.

Transportation
The building is accessible within walking distance west of Taiyuan Station of Taiwan Railways.

See also
 List of tourist attractions in Taiwan

References

External links

 

1930 establishments in Taiwan
Buildings and structures in Taichung
Houses completed in 1930
Houses in Taiwan
Tourist attractions in Taichung